George Ruggles Gold (October 9, 1830 – June 1, 1902) was a Michigan politician.

Early life
He served as a director of the Genesee County Savings Bank.

Political life
In 1867, Gold was elected to the first of two terms in the office of Flint City Recorder.  He was elected as the Mayor of City of Flint in 1898 for a single 1-year term.

References

Mayors of Flint, Michigan
1830 births
1902 deaths
19th-century American politicians